Komletinci is a village in eastern Croatia located east of Otok. The population is 1,649 (census 2011).

Name
The name of the village in Croatian is plural.

References

Populated places in Vukovar-Syrmia County
Populated places in Syrmia